Antonio Sánchez Díaz de Rivera (born 12 June 1953) is a Mexican politician from the National Action Party. From 2006 to 2009 he served as Under Secretary of the LX Legislature of the Mexican Congress representing Puebla.

References

1953 births
Living people
People from Puebla
National Action Party (Mexico) politicians
21st-century Mexican politicians
Monterrey Institute of Technology and Higher Education alumni
Deputies of the LX Legislature of Mexico
Members of the Chamber of Deputies (Mexico) for Puebla